The Flood Forecasting Centre (FFC) is a joint venture between the Environment Agency and the Met Office to provide improved flood risk guidance for England and Wales. The FFC is based in the Operations Centre at the Met Office headquarters in Exeter and is jointly staffed from both organisations.

Background

Following severe flooding across the UK in 2007 a review was commissioned by the government to see what lessons could be learned. Chaired by Sir Michael Pitt the review produced a number of recommendations which were published in June 2008, among them was the recommendation that the different agencies work more closely together to improve warnings services.

Formation and role

The FFC was officially opened on 21 April 2009 in London by Environment Minister Hilary Benn. Its role is to provide better advice to governments, local authorities, emergency responders and the general public via its parent organisations. It faced its first major test in November 2009 when severe flooding affected Northern England, in particular Cumbria and the town of Cockermouth. The Pitt Review progress report highlighted the accuracy of the advice issued ahead of this event. In April 2011 the FFC moved from central London to a permanent base within the Operations Centre at the Met Office HQ in Exeter. It currently provides a range of operational Hydrometeorology services across England and Wales and limited services for Scotland and Northern Ireland.

Operational services

The FFC provides a range of services to a number of customer groups:

 Category 1 and 2 responders in England and Wales; a daily Flood Guidance Statement, telephone consultancy and web based services
 Government Services; precautionary calls to facilitate discussion on flood risk
 Hydrometeorology Services; to Environment Agency and Natural Resources Wales Flood Forecasting and Flood Resilience Teams (who in turn provide flood warnings to the public in communities at risk)
 Coastal Services for England, Wales, Scotland and Northern Ireland
 Public Services; via a three-day flood-risk forecast

References

External links
Official FFC website
Official Environment Agency website
Official Met Office website
The Pitt Review

Flood control
Organizations established in 2009
Governmental meteorological agencies in Europe
Organisations based in Devon
Environmental organisations based in the United Kingdom
Risk management
Weather forecasting
Met Office
2009 establishments in the United Kingdom